Patrik Sten Ola Strenius (born 6 March 1972 in Karlskrona) is a retired Swedish athlete who competed in the sprinting events. He represented his country at the 1996 Summer Olympics in the 4 × 100 metres relay where Sweden finished fifth in the final, having set the national record in the semifinals. In addition, he reached the finals at the 1995 World Indoor Championships and 1996 European Indoor Championships.

Competition record

Personal bests
Outdoor
100 metres – 10.21 (+1.3 m/s) (Madrid 1996)
200 metres – 21.01 (0.0 m/s) (Malmö 1996)
Indoor
60 metres – 6.61 (Barcelona 1995)

References

All-Athletics profile

1972 births
Living people
Swedish male sprinters
People from Karlskrona
Olympic athletes of Sweden
Athletes (track and field) at the 1996 Summer Olympics
Sportspeople from Blekinge County
20th-century Swedish people